AlphaCrowd is a New Zealand equity crowdfunding platform for digital and technology companies and investors, that was licensed by the Financial Markets Authority in October 2015. In November 2016, the company raised equity capital from a Chinese angel investor at a valuation of around $2.7 million; of the $800,000 raised a part was conditional on the investor being granted a travel visa to New Zealand.

Board of directors 
 Aaron Hockly
 Matthew Holdich
 Bart Janowski (Founder)
 Lasith Weeraratne

Successful offers 
 The Module Project – $207,000
 LazyAz – $240,769.20

References 

Crowdfunding platforms of New Zealand